Tout Puissant Molunge  is a Congolese football club based in Mbandaka, Équateur province and currently playing in the Linafoot Ligue 2, the second level of the Congolese football. They play at 10,000 capacity Stade Bakusu.

Honours
Equateur Provincial League
 Winners (5): 2002, 2005, 2006, 2008, 2010

Performance in CAF competitions
CAF Cup: 1 appearances
1993 – First Round

References

External links
Club profile - Soccerway.com

Mbandaka
Football clubs in the Democratic Republic of the Congo
Sports clubs in the Democratic Republic of the Congo